Symphoricarpos acutus, the sharpleaf snowberry, is a North American species of trailing shrubs in the honeysuckle family. It is native to the western United States (southern Oregon, western Nevada, and northern California).

Symphoricarpos acutus is a trailing herb less than 30 cm (1 foot) tall. It has pink flowers and white fruits.

References

External links

acutus
Flora of the Western United States
Plants described in 1884
Bird food plants
Flora without expected TNC conservation status